Pierre Descaves (1924-2014) was a French politician.

Early life
Pierre Descaves was born on 1 October 1924 in Khenchela, French Algeria.

Career
Descaves served during World War II. During the Algerian War, he served in the Organisation armée secrète.

He joined the National Front in 1983. He served as a member of the National Assembly from 1986 to 1988, representing Oise. He ran unsuccessfully to become the Mayor of Noyon in 1995, by a small margin. Nevertheless, he served on its city council from 1989 to 2001.

In 2009, he left the National Front and joined the Party of France, founded by Carl Lang.

He wrote five books.

Death
He died at the American Hospital of Paris in Neuilly-sur-Seine on 7 May 2014 at the age of eighty-nine.

Bibliography
La Guerre des immondes (Paris: Editions Godefroy de Bouillon, 2002).
Des rêves suffisamment grands (prefaced by Jean-Claude Martinez, Paris: Déterna, 2005).
La Salsa des cloportes (prefaced by Bruno Gollnisch, Paris: Déterna, 2006).
Une autre histoire de l'OAS : Topologie d'une désinformation (La Chaussée-d'Ivry: Atelier Fol'Fer, 2008).
Interdit aux chiens d'aboyer ! (La Chaussée-d'Ivry: Atelier Fol'fer, 2011).

References

1924 births
2014 deaths
People from Khenchela
People of French Algeria
Pieds-Noirs
National Rally (France) politicians
Party of France politicians
Deputies of the 8th National Assembly of the French Fifth Republic
French non-fiction writers
French Algeria
French military personnel of World War II
Members of the Organisation armée secrète